Luis Felipe Ortega (born 1966, Mexico City) is a Mexican contemporary artist. Since 1993 he has exhibited individually and collectively both in Mexico and abroad. Representative of Mexico's Pavilion in the 56 Venice Biennale in 2015, with Tania Candiani.

References

External links 
 Luis Felipe Ortega Website.
 Luis Felipe Ortega on Montoro12 Gallery .

1966 births
Living people
Mexican contemporary artists
Artists from Mexico City